Jack D. H. Hays (February 17, 1917 – June 18, 1995) was a justice of the Supreme Court of Arizona from January 4, 1969 to January 5, 1987. He served as chief justice for three consecutive terms, from January 1972 to December 1974. At the time of his death, Hays still held the record for the most opinions authored by a justice in any single year (100).

Biography
Hays graduated from Southern Methodist University Law in 1941.

In 1941 Hays enlisted in the United States Army. He was commissioned as an artillery officer, ultimately achieving the rank of Major. He served in combat in the Italian campaign during World War II.  Before his overseas assignment he was stationed at Fort Huachuca. He returned to Arizona after the war and became a member of the Arizona bar in 1946.

In 1951, Hays worked as Assistant City Attorney for Phoenix. In 1952, while acting City Attorney, Hays worked to desegregate Sky Harbor Airport. In November 1952, Hays was elected to the Arizona House of Representatives as a Republican legislator from Maricopa County.  He served in the 21st Arizona State Legislature from 1953-54.

In 1954, Hays was an Assistant United States Attorney. Hays spent seven years as the United States Attorney for Arizona and ten years as a trial judge before being elevated to the Supreme Court. Hays was a noted conservative.

Hays's judicial career began in 1960 when Arizona Governor Paul Fannin appointed him to be a Maricopa County Superior Court Judge. During his time on the Superior Court, he was Maricopa County's only juvenile court judge.

Hays was elected to the Supreme Court in 1968, taking his seat on January 4, 1969. On the bench, Hays wrote a notable dissent in Grimm v. Board of Pardons & Paroles, writing, "Beware, oh unsuspecting trial judge, that when your decision to place a felon on probation goes horribly awry, the majority of my brothers sitting in cloistered ivory tower call your actions gross and subject you to the consequences thereof."

Hays supported Arizona's transition from elected judges to a merit selection system.

Harriet C. Babbitt clerked for Justice Hays.

References

Further reading
 William A. Holohan et al., "Justice Jack D. H. Hays", 37 Ariz. L. Rev. 951 (1995)
 Robert C. Broomfield, "Tribute to Jack D.H. Hays", 27 Ariz. St. L.J. 769 (1995)

1917 births
1995 deaths
Arizona Republicans
Chief Justices of the Arizona Supreme Court
People from White Pine County, Nevada
United States Attorneys for the District of Arizona
Justices of the Arizona Supreme Court
20th-century American judges